The Réseau de transport de la Capitale (RTC), brand name for Société de transport de Québec, provides urban public transit services in the Quebec City area. It was founded in 2002, continuing the operations of the former Société de transport de la communauté urbaine de Québec, as the latter was merged into the new  Quebec City.

Operations 

Among its services, the RTC operates six high-frequency lines: lines 800 through 804, and 807—branded Métrobus. Lines 800 and 801 run together from De Marly to Dorchester/de la Couronne. Line 801 continues on to Terminus du Zoo, while line 800 diverges to the Montmorency falls. Line 802, runs from Terminus Beauport to Station Belvédère. Then, line 803 runs from Terminus les Saules to Terminus Beauport, through Le Mesnil, Lebourgneuf and Charlesbourg. Line 804, links Sainte-Foy with Loretteville going through the Terminus les Saules and the Université Laval campus and then finally the 807 goes between De Marly and Place D'Youville by riding along the Chemin Sainte-Foy until it merges to Rue Saint-Jean. Service is every 5 minutes during peak times, every 10 minutes before and after then, and every 15 minutes during less-travelled times.

In addition to regular routes, the RTC also provides:

 Parc-o-bus: select parking lots to encourage use of public transit
 STAC - Service de transport adapté de la Capitale: adapted Transport for the Physically Challenged

Future projects
A study concluded in March 2003, stated the introduction of light rail transit services would be feasible for the entire area. In March 2018, a $3 billion proposal for a combination of tramways (the Quebec City Tramway), an electric trambus and reserved bus lanes was announced.

In November 2019, the Réseau de transport de la Capitale announced that it is planning to open the city's first BRT line along Boulevard Charest by 2026, utilizing a fleet of bi-articulated electric buses. Quebec City is the first and only in North American city to make such an announcement.

Fleet
 NovaBus LFS  (2006-2013)
 NovaBus LFS Artic  (2009-2012) (Métrobus service)
 NovaBus LFS HEV  (2015-2021)
 NovaBus LFS Artic HEV  (2016-2022) (Métrobus service)
 Van Hool A330K Hybrid  (2018-2019)

 denotes wheelchair access

References

External links 

 RTC website (French only)
 RTC's "Bus User's Guide" (English)

Quebec City
Transport in Quebec City
Quebec City